This article has details on Hertha BSC Berlin statistics.

Recent seasons

Coaches since 1963

Honours

League 
 German Champions: 2
 Winners: 1930, 1931
 Runners-up: 1926, 1927, 1928, 1929, 1975
 2. Bundesliga Champions: 3
 1990, 2011, 2013

Cup
 DFB-Ligapokal: 2
 Winners: 2001, 2002
 Runners-up: 2000
 DFB-Pokal: 0
 Runners-up: 1977, 1979, 19931

Regional
 Oberliga Berlin Champions:
 1925, 1926, 1927, 1928, 1929, 1930, 1931, 1933
 Gauliga Berlin-Brandenburg Champions:
 1935, 1937, 1944
 Brandenburg football champions:
 1906, 1915, 1917, 1918, 1925–31, 1933
 Berliner Landespokal (Tiers 3-7):
 Winners: 1920, 1924, 1928, 1929, 1943, 1958, 1959, 1966, 1967, 19761, 1987, 19921, 20041

Note 1: Reserve Team

Youth
 German Under 17 championship
 Champions: 2000, 2003, 2005
 Runners-up: 1991
 Under 19 Bundesliga North/Northeast
 Champions: 2005, 2006
 Under 17 Bundesliga North/Northeast
 Champions: 2008

External links 
 Hertha BSC Berlin on fussballdaten.de (German)
  (German)

German football club statistics